La Revolución: Live ("The Revolution") is the second live CD/DVD album by the Puerto Rican reggaeton/hip hop duo Wisin & Yandel released on September 21, 2010, through Machete Music. The album also include six tracks recorded in studio, including the first and only single "Estoy Enamorado". The album was released in a one album only digitally, and in two volumes in CD format.

Background
This album was recorded in San Juan, Puerto Rico at the José Miguel Agrelot Coliseum in December 2009. The album include live songs performed on their La Revolución World Tour, as well six unreleased songs recorded on studio, including "Irresistible" also included on the Step Up 3D soundtrack album and the first single "Estoy Enamorado". The album was set to be released first on August 17, back later to September 14, but finally the album's release date was on September 21, 2010.

Reception

Commercial performance 
On the Billboard charts the volume for each album was charted separately, the Volume 1 debuted at number 5 on the Top Latin Albums while on the Top Rap Albums the album debuted at number 16. The Volume 2 debuted at number 6 on the Top Latin Albums and number 17 Top Rap Albums, one position lower in each chart than the Volume 1.

Critical response 

About the Vol. 1, David Jeffries from Allmusic said "Those who have experienced Wisin & Yandel's intense live show know what excitement they're in for here, but the concept of splitting the reggaeton duo's La Revolución Live set into two volumes calls for a little guidance. Both volumes feature highlights from the La Revolución tour -- a definite high point of the duo's career -- followed by three new studio tracks [...] This is a desirable package on its own, but it works best when paired with the equally pleasing Vol. 2." About the Vol. 2 he said "The live portion of Vol. 2 features a live band that adds some organic flavor to the synthetic backing tracks. Their flashy -- and fairly trashy -- collaboration with R&B star T-Pain, gives Vol. 2 the slight edge over Vol. 1, but both work best when paired for the full La Revolución Live experience."

Promotion
Two songs were released on July 12, 2010, through iTunes, the first single "Estoy Enamorado" and "Irresistible" a song included on the Step Up 3D soundtrack album, added later on La Revolución: Live track listing.

Singles
"Estoy Enamorado" was selected as the first and only single from the album released digitally on July 12, 2010. The music video was premiered on August 19, 2010, it was directed by Wisin & Yandel's long-time director, Jessy Terrero, a music video for the Remix featuring Mexican-American singer-songwriter Larry Hernández was also filmed, but not yet released.

Track listing
The duó wrote or co-wrote every song on the album. Others who worked on the songs are given below.

Volume One

Volume Two

Both Volumes Together

Special edition

Charts

La Revolucion: Live, Vol. 1

La Revolucion: Live, Vol. 2 

Notes: 
Each volume was charted separately

See also
List of number-one Billboard Latin Rhythm Albums of 2010

References

External links
Wisin & Yandel –  official music website at Universal Music Latin Entertainment
Official website

Wisin & Yandel live albums
2010 live albums
Spanish-language live albums
Machete Music live albums